Spring greens, or spring vegetables, are the edible young leaves or new plant growth of a large number of plants that are most fit for consumption when their newest growth happens in the spring. Many leaf vegetables become less edible as they age and bitter, or potentially even toxic, compounds start to form. Harvesting of spring vegetables is common across Native American cultures.

Foraging

Since most leaf vegetables are very difficult to store and keep well, commercial production and distribution requires a high amount of pollution and plastic waste. Foraging for spring greens has been proposed as a possible way to reduce the impacts of demand for commercial greens.

However, it is important for foragers to take the necessary precautions and understand the risks. Many spring greens grow as "weeds" throughout the world in disturbed habitats. Plants growing in soils contaminated with heavy metals or pesticides can accumulate those pollutants (at different proclivities for different species). In addition, misidentification of species can often lead to consumption of poisonous and toxic plants.

Examples of spring greens

 Rubus spp. — the tender spring shoots of certain brambles (Rubus species) (e.g. salmonberry and thimbleberry) are eaten by many Native American tribal communities like many Séliš peoples (e.g. Muckleshoot). These "sprouts" are only available for a few weeks unless you travel Northwards.
 Stellaria media — chickweed is native to Eurasia but naturalized throughout the world, often growing as a weed. New growth is trimmed off from March through April. When it's too mature, it has a stringy or tough texture.
 Galium spp. — cleavers are common throughout temperate zones of both hemispheres. Some species seeds' also contain caffeine and are used as a coffee substitute. Young leaves can be eaten raw or cooked, but older leaves become too fibrous for eating.
 Taraxacum officinale — dandelions have a long history of culinary usage. The leaves contain many vitamins and nutrients important for human health. Young tender leaves can be pinched from the center of the plants but older leaves become extremely bitter as they are exposed to more and more sunlight.
 Helwingia japonica — a Japanese helwingia. Young leaves, as well as flowers, are eaten and/or cooked.
 Cryptotaenia canadensis — young leaves and stems of honewort are boiled or used as a seasoning similar to parsley.
 Chenopodium album — lamb's quarters commonly grow as "weeds" throughout the world, but are cultivated in Northern India and many other parts of the world. Leaves from wild plants can be harvested spring to early summer. They are best when young, but can also be harvested from the top of the plant later in the season. They are used in salads, pesto sauces, soups, and more.
 Portulaca oleracea — purslane is found throughout the world. It can be eaten fresh, stir-fried, or added to soups.
 Urtica dioica — stinging nettles are native to Eurasia and Western Africa, but are now found worldwide. They are (usually) covered in hollow stinging hairs that inject histamine when handled. However, these hairs can easily be neutralized by boiling, scorching, or even drying them out. 
 Viola spp. — most violet species have edible leaves (and flowers) and are at their most palatable in the spring. However, leaves usually contain saponins and so can cause digestive upset if eaten in large quantities.
 Oxalis stricta — wood sorrel leaves are edible. However, they contain oxalic acid which causes them to be tart and should not be consumed in large quantities.

See also

 Spring greens (Brassica oleracea)
 List of leaf vegetables
 Foraging
 Leaf vegetable
 Microgreens
 Salad
 Sansai
 Sprouting
 Bom-namul

References

 Leaf vegetables